Álvaro Montero Fernández (born 5 November 1989) is a Spanish footballer who plays for Inter de Madrid as a forward.

Club career
Born in Madrid, Montero made his senior debuts with local AD Villaviciosa de Odón in the 2008–09 season. In the 2009 summer he joined AD Alcorcón B also in the lower leagues, but returned to former club in 2010.

In July 2011 Montero moved to another reserve team, Real Zaragoza B of the Segunda División B. After being sparingly used during the season, he joined fellow third-divisioner RSD Alcalá in July of the following year.

On 3 August 2013 Montero moved to Zamora CF, also in the third tier. After scoring nine times in 19 matches, he joined Real Jaén. On 23 February 2014 Montero played his first match as a professional, starting in a 0–0 away draw against Córdoba CF in the Segunda División.

On 6 August 2019, he signed with the Italian Serie C club Bisceglie.

On 25 August 2020 he moved to Monopoli.

On 22 January 2021, he joined Fano.

References

External links

1989 births
Living people
Footballers from Madrid
Spanish footballers
Association football forwards
Segunda División players
Segunda División B players
Tercera División players
Serie C players
Primera Federación players
AD Alcorcón B players
Real Zaragoza B players
Zamora CF footballers
Real Jaén footballers
FC Cartagena footballers
UD Almería B players
RSD Alcalá players
CD Lealtad players
Marbella FC players
A.S. Bisceglie Calcio 1913 players
S.S. Monopoli 1966 players
Alma Juventus Fano 1906 players
Internacional de Madrid players
Spanish expatriate footballers
Expatriate footballers in Italy
Spanish expatriate sportspeople in Italy